Ship movement service (short: SMS;  | also: ship movement radiocommunication service) is – according to Article 1.31 of the International Telecommunication Union's (ITU) Radio Regulations (RR)  – defined as «A safety service in the maritime mobile service other than a port operations service, between coast stations and ship stations, or between ship stations, in which messages are restricted to those relating to the movement of ships. Messages which are of a public correspondence nature shall be excluded from this service.»

See also

Classification
The ITU Radio Regulations classifies this radiocommunication service as follows:
Mobile-satellite service (article 1.25)
Maritime mobile service (article 1.28)
Maritime mobile-satellite service (article 1.29)
Port operations service (article 1.30)
Ship movement service

References / sources 

 International Telecommunication Union (ITU)

Mobile services ITU
Maritime communication